A stockbroker is a regulated broker, broker-dealer, or registered investment adviser (in the United States) who may provide financial advisory and investment management services and execute transactions such as the purchase or sale of stocks and other investments to financial market participants in return for a commission, markup, or fee, which could be based on a flat rate, percentage of assets, or hourly rate. The term also refers to financial companies, offering such services.

Examples of professional designations held by individuals in this field, which affects the types of investments they are permitted to sell and the services they provide include chartered financial consultants, certified financial planners or chartered financial analysts (in the United States and UK), chartered strategic wealth professionals (in Canada), chartered financial planners (in the UK). The Financial Industry Regulatory Authority provides an online tool designed to help understand professional designations in the United States.

Terms

The other names or titles include share holder registered representative (in the United States and Canada), trading representative (in Singapore), or more broadly, an investment broker, investment adviser, financial adviser, wealth manager, and investment professional.

History of stock broking

The first recorded buying and selling of shares occurred in Rome in the 2nd century BC. After the fall of the Western Roman Empire, stockbroking did not become a profession until after the Renaissance, when government bonds were traded in Italian city-states such as Genoa and Venice. In 1602, the Amsterdam Stock Exchange (now Euronext Amsterdam) became the first official stock market with trading in shares of the Dutch East India Company, the first company to issue stock. In 1698, the London Stock Exchange opened at the Jonathan's Coffee-House. On May 17, 1792, the New York Stock Exchange opened under a platanus occidentalis (buttonwood tree) in New York City, as 24 stockbrokers signed the Buttonwood Agreement, agreeing to trade five securities under that buttonwood tree.

Licensing and training requirements

Australia
Up until January 1, 2019, investment professionals that offer financial advice in Australia had to pass training pursuant to RG146. They must hold an Australian Financial Services Licence that is overseen by the Australian Securities and Investments Commission. They are subject to fiduciary obligations.

As of 2019, Australia's biggest online stockbroker was Commonwealth Securities, other large brokers were ANZ Share Investing, nabtrade and Westpac Online Investing.

Canada
In Canada, to be licensed as a "registered representative" or an "investment advisor" and thus be qualified to offer investment advice and trade all instruments with the exception of derivatives, an individual employed by an investment firm must have completed the Canadian Securities Course, the Conduct & Practices Handbook, and the 90-day Investment Advisor Training Program. Within 30 months of obtaining designation as a "registered representative", the registrant is further required to meet the post-licensing proficiency requirement to complete the Wealth Management Essentials course. A registered representative is also required to complete 30 hours of professional development (product knowledge) and 12 hours of compliance training every three year continuing education cycle as set out by the Investment Industry Regulatory Organization of Canada. To trade options and/or futures, a registered representative must pass the Derivatives Fundamentals Course in addition to the Options Licensing Course and/or the Futures Licensing Course, or alternatively, the Derivatives Fundamentals Options Licensing Course for options.

Hong Kong
In Hong Kong, to become a representative one has to work for a licensed firm and pass 3 exams to prove competency. Passing a fourth exam results in obtaining a "specialist" license. All tests can be taken with the Hong Kong Securities Institute. After passing all tests, approval must be received by the Securities and Futures Commission.

India
Share brokers in India are governed by the Securities and Exchange Board of India Act, 1992 and brokers must register with the Securities and Exchange Board of India. The National Stock Exchange of India and the Bombay Stock Exchange via brokers, provide an ecosystem to investors to trade in capital markets through various channels- broker offices, investment advisor or screen-based electronic trading system. An individual employed by an investment firm must complete the National Institute of Securities Markets (NISM) exam and apply to SEBI for registration as an Investment Advisor.

Stock market advisory and research services are highly regulated in India. Only SEBI registered stock advisory and investment research analysts are allowed to do so. The complete details of these authorized persons are available on website of SEBI for protection of investors.

Ireland
The recognized benchmark designation for investment professionals in Ireland is the QFA ("qualified financial adviser") designation, which is awarded to those who pass the Professional Diploma in Financial Advice and agree to comply with the ongoing "continuous professional development" (CPD) requirements. The qualification, and attaching CPD program, meets the "minimum competency requirements" specified by the Financial Regulator, for advising on and selling five categories of retail financial products:
 Stock shares, bonds, and other investment instruments
 Savings, investments, and pensions
 Mortgage loans
 Consumer credit
 Life insurance

As of 2019, Davy and Goodbody were Irish largest stockbrokers.

New Zealand
In New Zealand, the New Zealand Qualifications Authority oversees qualifications. The New Zealand Certificate in Financial Services (Level 5) is the minimum level of qualification necessary to offer investment advice.

Singapore
In Singapore, becoming a trading representative requires passing 4 exams, modules 1A, 5, 6 and 6A, from the Institute of Banking and Finance and applying for the license through MAS and SGX.

South Africa
The Johannesburg Securities Exchange rules require that member firms must be under the control of a "qualified stockbroker", who is also an executive director of the firm; and branches, likewise managed. 

The South African Institute of Stockbrokers (SAIS)  offers the six exams required to become such, a Certified Stockbroker, or CSb(SA), following 3 years' work experience, and with other educational requirements met. 
See also re. "Regulated Positions" and "Registered Persons" at The South African Institute of Financial Markets.
(SAIS also offers the Financial Markets Practitioner vocational certification.)

South Korea
In South Korea, the Korea Financial Investment Association oversees the licensing of investment professionals.

United Kingdom
Stockbroking is a regulated profession in the United Kingdom and brokers must achieve a recognised qualification from the Appropriate Qualifications list of the Financial Conduct Authority (FCA). The Chartered Institute for Securities & Investment (CISI), established in 1992, is the largest UK professional body for investment professionals. It evolved from the London Stock Exchange, has around 45,000 members in over 100 countries and delivers more than 40,000 exams each year. CFA UK also offers qualifications.  It represents the interests of around 12,000 investment professionals and is part of the worldwide network of members of the CFA Institute.

Qualifications include: the CISI Level 4 Diploma in Investment Advice and the CISI Level 7 Diploma in Wealth Management

United States

The Financial Industry Regulatory Authority, a self-regulatory organization, regulates investment professionals in the United States. Exams that individuals may take for accreditation include the Series 7 exam, the Uniform Securities Agent State Law Exam (Series 63), the Uniform Combined State Law Exam (Series 66), and the Uniform Investment Adviser Law Exam (Series 65).

Individuals holding some of those licenses, such as the Series 6 exam, cannot be called stockbrokers since they are prohibited from selling stocks. Selling variable products, such as a variable annuity contract or variable universal life insurance policy, typically requires the broker to also have one or another state insurance department licenses.

Individuals and firms are regulated by the U.S. Securities and Exchange Commission and laws related to the Investment Advisers Act of 1940, including laws related to fiduciary.

See also

 Boiler room (business)
 Electronic trading platform
 Floor broker
 Mutual fund
 Prime brokerage
 Securities market
 Stock exchange
 Stock market
 Stock market data systems
 Stock valuation

References

Financial services occupations